Priory Halt railway station served the district of Tendring, Essex, England, from 1920 to 1965 on the Mayflower Line.

History 
The station opened on 1 January 1920 by the Great Eastern Railway. It was intended for admiralty use only and it was paid by them; there was an admiralty depot nearby. The station closed on 1 February 1965.

References

External links 

Disused railway stations in Essex
Former Great Eastern Railway stations
Railway stations opened in 1920
Railway stations closed in 1965
1920 establishments in England
1965 disestablishments in England
Tendring
Railway stations in Great Britain opened in the 20th century